Jacob Zern (February 24, 1845 – March 20, 1926) was an American physician, judge, and politician who served as a member of the Pennsylvania House of Representatives and Pennsylvania State Senate.

Early life and education 
Zern was born in New Hanover Township, Montgomery County, Pennsylvania. Zern's father was a reverend. Zern was the descendant of immigrants from Germany. He attended local public schools and the Millersville State Normal School. Zern served in the American Civil War, where he was assigned to guard rail lines in Berkeley County, West Virginia. After he was discharged, Zern earned a Doctor of Medicine from the School of Medicine at the University of Pennsylvania.

Career 
In 1868, Zern established a private medical practice in Weissport, Pennsylvania. From 1879 to 1882, he served as a member of the Pennsylvania House of Representatives. He was then appointed to serve as a judge of Carbon County, Pennsylvania from 1894 to 1899. In 1900, Zern launched an unsuccessful bid for Pennsylvania State Senate as a member of the Democratic Party. Zern then re-registered as a member of the Fusion Party and was elected in 1902, serving until 1906.

Death 
Zern died on March 20, 1926 in Lehighton, Pennsylvania.

References 

1845 births
1926 deaths
People from Montgomery County, Pennsylvania
Democratic Party members of the Pennsylvania House of Representatives
Perelman School of Medicine at the University of Pennsylvania alumni